Distal Revascularization and Interval Ligation (DRIL) is a surgical method of treating vascular access steal syndrome.


History
DRIL was first proposed by Harry Schanzer and colleagues in 1988.

Procedure
A short distal bypass is created and the artery just distal to the AV anastomosis is ligated.

References

Nephrology
Vascular surgery